Lewis Cliff is an irregular cliff, about  long, extending south from Mount Achernar along the west side of Walcott Neve, Antarctica. It was named by the Advisory Committee on Antarctic Names for Richard E. Lewis, a  U.S. Navy Aviation Electronics Technician, who was injured during Operation Deep Freeze II, 1956–57.

References

Cliffs of the Ross Dependency
Shackleton Coast